Michael Papajohn (born November 7, 1964) is an American character actor, stuntman and former college baseball player for the LSU Tigers baseball team. He played Dennis Carradine in Sam Raimi's Spider-Man trilogy.

Early life
Papajohn was born and raised Vestavia Hills, a suburb of Birmingham, Alabama, to a Greek American family. He graduated from Vestavia Hills High School in 1983 and went on to play for two years at Gulf Coast Community College in Panama City, Florida. He was drafted by the Texas Rangers in the 1985 Major League Baseball Draft. Instead of signing a contract, he accepted a baseball scholarship to Louisiana State University in Baton Rouge, Louisiana.

College career
Nicknamed Poppy, Papajohn was an outfielder for Skip Bertman's LSU Tigers. He was a member of the 1986 SEC baseball tournament All-Tournament Team and he, along with teammates Mark Guthrie,  Joey Belle, Jeff Reboulet, Jeff Yurtin, Jack Voigt and Barry Manuel, among others, helped LSU make its first College World Series appearance in 1986.

Acting career
Papajohn got his start in acting while he was a student at Louisiana State University.  Already an athlete, he was hired to be a stunt performer in the film Everybody's All-American which was being filmed on the campus of LSU and featured football action sequences filmed during LSU football games in Tiger Stadium.  From there he moved on to being a stunt performer in films such as Money Talks and Starship Troopers and acting in films like Predator 2, For Love of the Game, where he plays New York Yankees slugger Sam Tuttle, and Spider-Man and Spider-Man 3, in which he plays Dennis Carradine, the robber that was thought to have killed Uncle Ben with a pistol; Papajohn also makes a cameo appearance as a different character in the film series' reboot, The Amazing Spider-Man. He has also starred in Terminator 3: Rise of the Machines, Transformers: Revenge of the Fallen, Terminator Salvation, S.W.A.T., Land of the Lost, G-Force in 2009,The Assault and Jeepers Creepers 3 in 2017.

Filmography

 1988 Everybody's All-American as Unknown
 1990 Predator 2 as Subway Gang
 1991 The Last Boy Scout as Hitman 
 1992 The Babe as Heckler
 1992 Mr. Baseball as Rick
 1994 Little Big League as Tucker Kain
 1995 Dominion as John
 1995 The Indian in the Cupboard as Cardassian
 1995 Wild Bill as Extra (uncredited)
 1996 Naked Souls as Driver
 1996 Eraser as CIA Agent Schiffer
 1997 Spawn as Glen, Zack's Dad
 1998 My Giant as Tough Guy #1
 1998 The Waterboy as Unknown
 1999 Inferno as Creep
 1999 For Love of the Game as Sam Tuttle
 2000 Charlie's Angels as Bathroom Thug
 2000 The Patriot of America as Payne (voice)
 2001 The Animal as Patrolman Brady
 2001 Rustin as Trent Cotee
 2002 Whacked as Shannon
 2002 Spider-Man as Carjacker
 2002 The Hot Chick as Security Guard
 2003 A Man Apart as Fake Uniformed Cop (uncredited)
 2003 Hulk as Technician #5
 2003 Terminator 3: Rise of the Machines as Paramedic #1
 2003 S.W.A.T. as Bistro Gangster #3
 2003 House of Sand and Fog as Carpenter
 2004 The Last Shot as Ed Rossi Jr.
 2005 The Longest Yard as Guard Papajohn
 2005 Domino as Cigliutti Goon (uncredited)
 2006 Larry the Cable Guy: Health Inspector as Diner Manager
 2006 How to Go Out on a Date in Queens as Man At Table
 2007 Spider-Man 3 as Dennis Carradine/Carjacker
 2007 Delta Farce as Bill's Neighbor
 2007 Live Free or Die Hard as Gabriel's Henchman (uncredited)
 2007 I Know Who Killed Me as Jacob K. / Joseph K.
 2008 Superhero Movie (2008) as Robber, 'Gimme Your Wallet'
 2008 Yes Man as Security Guard (uncredited)
 2009 Terminator Salvation as Carnahan
 2009 Land of the Lost as Astronaut (uncredited)
 2009 Transformers: Revenge of the Fallen as Colin 'Cal' Banes
 2009 G-Force as FBI Techie
 2010 Jonah Hex as Saber Guard
 2010 The Assault as Pillot
 2011 Drive Angry as Tattooed Cult Member
 2011 The Hit List as FBI Special Agent Drake Ford
 2012 This Means War as German Goon
 2012 For the Love of Money as Little Guy
 2012 The Amazing Spider-Man as Alfie (uncredited)
 2012 The Dark Knight Rises as Prison Guard (uncredited)
 2012 The Bourne Legacy as CIA Agent Larry
 2012 Gangster Squad as Mike 'The Flea'
 2013 Pawn Shop Chronicles as Spectator #1
 2013 Bering Sea Beast as Jonas
 2013 Escape Plan as Prisoner Beaten By Breslin
 2013 Homefront as Hitman #4
 2013–2015 Banshee as Delmont Munson, Bald Thug
 2014 Devil's Due as Officer Miska
 2014 Rage as Vory
 2014 Dawn of the Planet of the Apes as Cannon-Gunner
 2014 Get on Up as 1949 Cop
 2014 Nightcrawler as Security Guard
 2014 Selma as Major John Cloud
 2015 Wild Card as Pit Boss
 2015 Jurassic World as InGen Contractor
 2015 American Ultra as Otis
 2015 Nocturna as Lonny
 2016 My Many Sons as Pete's Dad
 2016 Cold Moon as Ed Gieger
 2016 Ozark Sharks as Rick
 2016 Jack Reacher: Never Go Back as DC Policeman At Restaurant
 2016 Live by Night as Maso's Crew (uncredited
 2017 Reborn as Dyson
 2017 Vengeance: A Love Story as J.J. Breen
 2017 Jeepers Creepers 3 as Frank
 2018 Jurassic World: Fallen Kingdom as InGen Contractor
 2019 Welcome to Acapulco as Apex
 2019 Black and Blue as Sergeant Leader
 2020 Unhinged as Homer

References

External links

LSUSports.net Incomplete Bio

1964 births
American male film actors
American male television actors
American people of Greek descent
American stunt performers
Living people
LSU Tigers baseball players
Male actors from Birmingham, Alabama
Baseball players from Birmingham, Alabama
20th-century American male actors
21st-century American male actors
People from Vestavia Hills, Alabama